The Thermaerobacter are an unassigned genus of bacteria placed within the class clostridia. Originally placed within the highly polyphyletic class Clostridia, order Clostridiales, according to the NCBI and LPSN, it is now thought to lie outside of the Bacillota.

Phylogeny
The currently accepted taxonomy is based on the List of Prokaryotic names with Standing in Nomenclature (LPSN) and National Center for Biotechnology Information (NCBI)

See also
 List of bacterial orders
 List of bacteria genera

References 

Eubacteriales
Bacteria genera